Gilis or Ģīlis is a surname. Notable people with the surname include:

Jānis Gilis (1943–2000), Latvian footballer
Antoine Gilis (1702–1781), French musician and composer
Valdis Ģīlis (born 1954), Latvian politician

See also
Gillis (surname)

Latvian-language masculine surnames